Sibangea pleioneura is a species of plant in the Putranjivaceae family. It is endemic to Tanzania.

References

Putranjivaceae
Endemic flora of Tanzania
Vulnerable plants
Taxonomy articles created by Polbot